Petar Kolendić (Dubrovnik, 17 September 1882 - Belgrade, 14 April 1969) was a Serbian and Croatian writer and literary historian.

He was mostly influenced by his professors -- Vatroslav Jagić, Konstantin Jireček, Václav Vondrák, and Milan Rešetar -- from the time he attended the universities in Zagreb, Berlin, Prague, and Belgrade. In academia, Kolendić acquired and assimilated a certain approach to the history of literature, to which he was to be faithful throughout his life.

In 1964, his writings were collected and printed in a book entitled "From the Ancient Dubrovnik", published by Belgrade's Srpsko književna zadruga. All of his essays deal with the literary and cultural past of the Serbian and Croatian people, from earliest, to the medieval, renaissance and baroque periods in Dubrovnik, Dalmatia, Slavonia, and Bosnia to the first half of the 19th century and the advent of Njegoš.

Honours 
 Member of the Serbian Academy of Sciences and Arts. 2 March 1946

See also
 Sava Bjelanović
 Frano Kulišić

References

1882 births
1969 deaths
20th-century Croatian writers
People from Dubrovnik
Croatian literary historians
Serb-Catholic movement in Dubrovnik